Rochester is a town in northwestern Haskell County, Texas, United States. The population was 324 at the 2010 census, down from 378 as of the 2000 census.

History
Rochester was founded by A. B. Carothers in 1906 as the Kansas City, Mexico and Orient Railway was built in the area. It takes its name from Rochester, New York.

Geography
Rochester is in northwestern Haskell County along Texas State Highway 6, which leads north  to Knox City and south  to Rule.

Demographics

As of the census of 2000,  378 people, 155 households, and 106 families resided in the town. The population density was 1,076.0 people per square mile (417.0/km2). The 191 housing units averaged 543.7 per square mile (210.7/km2). The racial makeup of the town was 65.34% White, 7.14% African American, 1.06% Native American, 24.07% from other races, and 2.38% from two or more races. Hispanics or Latinos of any race were 38.62% of the population.

Of the 155 households, 29.0% had children under the age of 18 living with them, 51.6% were married couples living together, 13.5% had a female householder with no husband present, and 31.6% were not families. About 30.3% of all households were made up of individuals, and 18.7% had someone living alone who was 65 years of age or older. The average household size was 2.44 and the average family size was 3.04.

In the town, the population was distributed as 25.9% under the age of 18, 8.2% from 18 to 24, 24.6% from 25 to 44, 19.8% from 45 to 64, and 21.4% who were 65 years of age or older. The median age was 39 years. For every 100 females, there were 96.9 males. For every 100 females age 18 and over, there were 95.8 males.

The median income for a household in the town was $20,357, and for a family was $25,893. Males had a median income of $17,188 versus $16,250 for females. The per capita income for the town was $12,912. About 24.2% of families and 29.4% of the population were below the poverty line, including 46.8% of those under age 18 and 20.8% of those age 65 or over.

Education
The Haskell Consolidated Independent School District operates public schools serving the community.

From the early 1900s to 2005, the single-campus Rochester Independent School District served the community. The high school was completed in 1938, and had served in that capacity until May 2005. Due to rapidly declining enrollment, the district, now named Rochester-County Line Independent School District, merged with Haskell CISD on June 1, 2005. The Rochester campus now serves as the district's junior high school.

During consolidation, some children transferred to Knox City and Rule schools.

Notable people

 Marcus Parks, host of The Last Podcast on the Left

References

Towns in Haskell County, Texas
Towns in Texas
1906 establishments in Texas
Populated places established in 1906